Karen Boback is an American politician and educator serving as a Republican member of the Pennsylvania House of Representatives for the 117th legislative district.

Education 
Boback was born in Scranton, Pennsylvania. She earned a bachelor's degree in elementary and special education and a master's degree in education from College Misericordia, a master's degree from elementary school guidance counseling Marywood University, and a Ph.D. in organizational leadership from the University of Pennsylvania.

Career 
Prior to her career in politics, Boback worked as a teacher, guidance counselor and college professor. She was presented with the Excellence in Education Award by College Misericordia in November 2006 and was named Harveys Lake Citizen of the Year in 2006.

In 2018, Boback announced "the leadership program she developed for high school students is up-and-running in the Dallas, Tunkhannock and Lake-Lehman School Districts."

Boback currently serves on the Tourism & Recreational Development and Veterans Affairs & Emergency Preparedness committees.

In 2022, Boback announced her intent to retire at the end of her current term. She was succeeded by Republican Michael Cabell.

Electoral history

References

External links
Pennsylvania House of Representatives - Karen Boback  official PA House website
Pennsylvania House Republican Caucus - Rep. Karen Boback official Party website
Karen Boback for State Representative official campaign website

1951 births
Living people
Republican Party members of the Pennsylvania House of Representatives
Politicians from Scranton, Pennsylvania
University of Pennsylvania alumni
Women state legislators in Pennsylvania
Marywood University alumni
University of Scranton alumni
Misericordia University alumni
21st-century American politicians
21st-century American women politicians